The Reunion Tour was a concert tour by heavy metal band Black Sabbath, celebrating the band's 2012 reunion and in support of their album 13, which was the group's first album to feature their original singer Ozzy Osbourne since 1978's Never Say Die! and original bassist Geezer Butler since 1994's Cross Purposes.

Background
On 11 November 2011, at the Whisky a Go Go in Los Angeles the band announced that the original lineup was reforming to tour in 2012 and cut a new album. The band was joined by Rick Rubin, who was set to produce the band's new album, the first to come from the original line up since 1978's Never Say Die!. "It was the obvious choice", explained Osbourne of Rubin as producer. "I've known Rick for many years."

Sabbath's last tour with Ozzy was in 2005, and the original lineup last appeared together when they were inducted into the Rock And Roll Hall Of Fame in 2006. They attempted to cut a new album with Rick Rubin in 2001, but the sessions fell apart and Osbourne turned his attention to his solo career. The second incarnation of the band featuring Ronnie James Dio reunited under the moniker Heaven & Hell in 2006, but split four years later, after Dio died.

The first announced date was set for the Download Festival in England on 10 June 2012, but later the band announced more dates in Europe.

On 9 January 2012, guitarist Tony Iommi was diagnosed with the "early stages of lymphoma", according to a statement sent out by the band's publicist. "His bandmates would like everyone to send positive vibes to the guitarist at this time", the statement says. "Iommi is currently working with doctors to establish the best treatment plan. The 'Iron Man' of Rock and Roll remains upbeat and determined to make a full and successful recovery." The band were forced to withdraw from a headlining slot at 2012's Coachella festival, following Iommi's announcement that he was suffering from the lymphoma form of cancer.

Barely a month had passed until 2 February 2012, when original drummer Bill Ward threatened to quit Black Sabbath, issuing a long statement indicating that he would not participate in the reunion unless he was presented with a "signable contract" that "reflects some dignity and respect toward me as an original member of the band." The following day, the band responded on Facebook: "We were saddened to hear yesterday via Facebook that Bill declined publicly to participate in our current Black Sabbath plans...we have no choice but to continue recording without him although our door is always open... We are still in the UK with Tony. Writing and recording the new album and on a roll... See you at Download!!! – Tony, Ozzy and Geezer" Ward would eventually bow out of playing drums for the group's shows scheduled for 2012 after failing to reach a contract agreement. Butler made it known that Tommy Clufetos, currently of Black Sabbath singer Ozzy Osbourne‘s solo band and a one-time member of Rob Zombie's touring outfit, would step in for Ward as Sabbath prepared to perform.

Just two weeks later on 17 February 2012, Black Sabbath reshuffled its reunion plans in light of Iommi's battle with lymphoma. The band  confirmed that they planned to play only one show on their planned European tour – Download Festival, which took place on 10 June in England and was preceded by a warm-up show in Birmingham on 19 May 2012, and then followed by a headlining slot at the Lollapalooza festival in Chicago, marking the band's only North American show of 2012. To make up for the cancellation of the shows, Osbourne headed out on a 17-date tour as part of Ozzy and Friends, which featured special guests such as Slash, Zakk Wylde and Butler on select dates.

The band's concert at Birmingham's O2 Academy was professionally filmed. On 9 August 2012 Black Sabbath released footage of performance of "Paranoid" from the show. The band's performances in at the Rod Laver Arena in Melbourne on 29 April and 1 May 2013 were professionally recorded and released as a live album and film, Live... Gathered in Their Masses.

After seeing their 2012 tour cut short due to Iommi's battle with lymphoma, Black Sabbath returned to the road in 2013, with the band playing shows in New Zealand, Australia, Japan, North America, South America and Europe. The band also headlined the first ever Ozzfest Japan in Chiba City, along with Slipknot, on 11–12 May 2013. The dates in 2013 and 2014 were arranged so that Iommi could return to the UK for treatment once every six weeks.

Tour dates

 A^ Download Festival warm-up show.

Canceled dates

Personnel
 Ozzy Osbourne – lead vocals, harmonica
 Tony Iommi – lead guitar
 Geezer Butler – bass guitar

with

 Adam Wakeman – keyboards, rhythm guitar
 Tommy Clufetos – drums

Supporting acts
 Svart Crown - German dates only
 Andrew W.K - Select 2013 U.S. Dates
 Shidad - New Zealand & Australian Leg
 Megadeth - Latin American Leg

Gross
2013: 641,928 tickets sold, $53.8 million from 54 shows

2014: 201,038 tickets sold, $18.2 million from 21 shows

Total available gross: 842,966 tickets sold, $72.0 million from 75 shows

References

External links
 Official Black Sabbath site

2012 concert tours
2013 concert tours
Black Sabbath concert tours
Reunion concert tours